Twelve West (stylized as twelve | west) is a 22-floor, mixed-use apartment and office building located in downtown Portland, Oregon, United States. The building is home to INDIGO @ twelve | west apartments and ZGF Architects LLP. During design and construction the building was known as “12W” and “ZGF Tower”, but the name changed after a naming contest in July 2009. Initial plans included a hotel and a total of 31 floors, but they were revised after the hotel company withdrew.

Wind turbines
Four 45-foot-tall (14m) wind turbines are mounted on the roof for the purpose of research and generating electricity. The turbines were expected to generate 9,000 kilowatt hours yearly and provide data on wind flows and bird-strikes. However, a study from the NREL indicated that the turbines are less productive; the system "generates approximately 5,500 kilowatt-hours (kWh)/year."

Tenants
There are three distinct uses for twelve | west in separate parts of the building. Ground floor provides retail space, a building lobby, and garage access.
Floors 2–5 are offices, currently the headquarters of ZGF Architects LLP, the architect of the building.

See also
List of tallest buildings in Portland, Oregon
Architecture in Portland, Oregon

References

External links
INDIGO @ twelve | west website
Indigo 12 West at Emporis
"Indigo @ 12 West" By N.P. Thompson Centuries Since the Day

2009 establishments in Oregon
Buildings and structures completed in 2009
Skyscraper office buildings in Portland, Oregon
Residential skyscrapers in Portland, Oregon
Southwest Portland, Oregon